Cache River State Natural Area is an Illinois state park centered on the Cache River (Illinois) of  in Johnson County, Illinois, United States.

References

State parks of Illinois
Protected areas of Johnson County, Illinois
Protected areas established in 1970
1970 establishments in Illinois
State Natural Areas of Illinois